Thalaivasal is a 1992 Tamil-language drama film directed by Selva. The film has an ensemble cast consisting of S. P. Balasubrahmanyam, Anand, Sivaranjani, Bhanu Prakash, Nassar, Napoleon and newcomer Vijay. It was released on 3 September 1992.

Plot

Nachiappan College is considered to be one of the worst colleges of Chennai; everyday violence erupts between two final-year groups. The students are influenced by the local bigwig Beeda Settu (Nassar), who sells ganja to the students and basically rules the college from outside. The first group is led by Sudhakar (Anand) whereas the other one is led by Kalaiarasan (Bhanu Prakash). The college management and the police get tired of that situation. They decide that they need to change the principal. The vice-principal, Chandran, dies to sit in that post but the college management asks the successful Shanmugasundaram (S. P. Balasubrahmanyam) to take the post. His daughter Shobana will study in the same college. The rest of the story is how Shanmugasundaram succeeds in his mission.

Cast

S. P. Balasubrahmanyam as Shanmugasundaram
Anand as Sudhakar
Sivaranjani as Shobana
Bhanu Prakash as Kalaiarasan
Nassar as Beeda Settu
Napoleon as Chandran
Vijay as Babu 
S.N. Vasanth as Gupta
Chitti as ACP Devaraj
Sabitha Anand as Saradha
Vaishnavi as Anandhi
Vichithra as 'Madippu' Hamsa
C.N.A. Parimal
Sampath Kumar
Vincent Roy as Vedachalam
Jayaprakash
Radhabhai
Swaminathan
Master Anand as Siddharth
Baby Shobana as Meena
MRK

Soundtrack

The film score and the soundtrack were composed by Bala Bharathi. The soundtrack, released in 1992, features 7 tracks with lyrics written by Vairamuthu.

Production
The success of the serial 'Neela Maala' facilitated Chozha Creations’ re-entry into film world and they gave the serial director Selva the opportunity to direct Thalaivasal. Except for playback singer S. P. Balasubrahmanyam and Nassar, most of the cast was new like Bhanu Prakash and Thalaivasal Vijay. It is a story revolving around college life which forms the foundation stone for the future of any individual.

Reception
The film completed a 100-day run at the box-office. The Indian Express wrote "Debutant writer-director Chelva has taken up a subject with which he does not seem to be familiar".

Legacy
After the film's success, Vijay added Thalaivasal as his stage name.

References

1992 films
Indian drama films
1990s Tamil-language films
Films set in universities and colleges
Films directed by Selva (director)
1992 drama films
1992 directorial debut films